Joaquín Cuadrada (23 June 1893 – 30 March 1969) was a Spanish swimmer. He competed in the men's 1500 metre freestyle event at the 1920 Summer Olympics.

References

External links
 

1893 births
1969 deaths
Olympic swimmers of Spain
Swimmers at the 1920 Summer Olympics
Swimmers from Barcelona
Spanish male freestyle swimmers